Homoglaea is a genus of moths of the family Noctuidae.

Species
 Homoglaea californica (Smith, 1891)
 Homoglaea carbonaria (Harvey, 1876)
 Homoglaea dives Smith, 1907
 Homoglaea hircina Morrison, 1876
 Homoglaea variegata Barnes & McDunnough, 1918

References
Natural History Museum Lepidoptera genus database
Homoglaea at funet

Cuculliinae